Grand Lake is a lake just west of Sheet Harbour, Nova Scotia. It is crescent-shaped. Its primary outflow is Little West River, which flows into the Northwest Arm of Sheet Harbour. The land area of the Sheet Harbour 36 Indian reserve extends to a part of the shore of Grand Lake.
In 2012, the Nova Scotia Government bought  of land near the lake worth $1.1 million.

References

External links
Land purchase article
Explore HRM

Lakes of Nova Scotia